2009–10 Estonian Cup was the twentieth season of the Estonian football knockout tournament organized by Estonian Football Association. Winners of the cup qualified for the second qualifying round of the 2010–11 UEFA Europa League. The defending champions were Flora Tallinn.

Clubs participating

 A&A Kinnisvara
 aaMeraaS
 Ajax Lasnamäe
 Alko
 Aspen
 Atletik
 Atli 2
 EBS
 Elva 2
 Esteve
 Eston Villa
 Fauna
 Flora Järva-Jaani
 Flora Rakvere
 Flora Tallinn 2
 Ganvix
 Guwalda
 Haiba
 Hansa Utd
 HansaNet.ee
 HaServ
 Hell Hunt
 Igiliikur
 Jalgpallihaigla
 Kadakas
 Kaitseliit 2
 Kalju 2 3
 Keskerakond 2
 Kristiine
 Koeru
 Kose
 Kotkad
 Kuressaare 2 3
 Legion
 Levadia
 Lootos
 Lootus
 Maaülikool
 Metec
 Metropool
 Navi
 Nõmme Utd
 Noorus 96
 Olympic
 Orbiit
 Otepää
 Paide 2
 Piraaja
 Premium 2
 Püsivus
 Quattromed
 Rada 2
 Reaal
 Reliikvia
 Saue
 Sillamäe Kalev 2
 Soccernet
 Tabasalu 2
 Tabivere
 Tallinna Kalev
 Tamme Auto 2
 Tammeka 2
 Tapa
 Toompea 2
 Trans
 Tulevik 2
 Twister
 Velldoris
 Võru
 Warrior

1/64

Teams with bye
Levadia, Flora II, Otepää, Noorus 96, Esteve, Olympic, Hell Hunt, Keskerakond, Toompea, Quattromed, Metec, Püsivus, Keskerakond II, Kalev Tallinn, Piraaja, Twister, Tammeka, Flora, aaMeraaS, Aspen, Toompea 1994, Soccernet, Eston Villa, Kuressaare, Elva II, HansaNet.ee, Tabasalu, A&A Kinnisvara, Rada II, Tamme Auto, Velldoris, Orbiit, Lootos, Rada, Elva, Nõmme United, Koeru, Navi, Kristiine, FCF Järva-Jaani.

1/32

1/16

1/8

Quarter-finals

Semi-finals

Final

References

External links
 Official site 

Estonian Cup seasons
Cup
Cup
Estonian